The 2021–22 CEV Champions League was the 63rd edition of the highest level European volleyball club competition organised by the European Volleyball Confederation.

Qualification

Pools composition
Drawing of Lots was held on 24 September 2021 in Ljubljana.

League round
 20 teams compete in the League round.
 The teams are split into 5 groups, each one featuring four teams.
 The top team in each pool and 3 best 2nd placed teams qualify for the quarterfinals. 
All times are local.

Pool A

|}

|}

Pool B

|}

|}

Pool C

|}

|}

Pool D

|}

|}

Pool E

|}

|}

Second place ranking

|}

Quarterfinals
 The winners of the ties qualify for the semifinals.
 In case the teams are tied after two legs, a Golden Set is played immediately at the completion of the second leg.
All times are local.

|}

First leg
|}

Second leg
|}

Semifinals
 The winners of the ties qualify for the final.
 In case the teams are tied after two legs, a Golden Set is played immediately at the completion of the second leg.
All times are local.

|}

First leg
|}

Second leg
|}

Final
 Place: Ljubljana
 Time: Central European Summer Time (UTC+02:00).

|}

Final standings

Notes

References

External links
 CEV Champions League Volley

CEV Champions League
CEV Champions League
CEV Champions League